Soviet Marshal of the aviation SKRIPKO Nikolai Semenovich (1902–1987)

At the beginning of the German-Soviet War (1941–1945), commander of the 3rd long-range bombers' corps, then commander of the Air Force of the 5th Army and deputy commander of the Air Force of the South-Western Front. From March 1942, was deputy commander of the long-range Air Force, and from December 1944 - first deputy commander of the 18th Air Army. Took part in organising combat use of long-range aviation units near Leningrad and Stalingrad, in the North Caucasus, in the Battle of Kursk, in the Crimea and during the liberation of Belarus, the Baltic countries and Eastern Prussia.

He was awarded many orders and medals.

External links
 Poster of Marshal SKRIPKO Nikolai Semenovich

1902 births
1987 deaths
Burials at Novodevichy Cemetery
Soviet Air Force marshals
Recipients of the Order of Lenin